The 2006–07 Liga Premier, also known as the TM Liga Premier for sponsorship reasons, is the fourth season of the Liga Premier, the second-tier professional football league in Malaysia.

The season was held from 22 December 2006 and concluded on 21 July 2007. A total of 11 clubs compete in a single group format for the promotion to expanded 2007–08 Liga Super season.

The Liga Premier champions for 2006–07 was PDRM. The club were promoted to 2007–08 Liga Super along with runners-up UPB-MyTeam.

League table

Note:
 A format changes was introduced as all clubs will compete in a single group compared to previous season.
 UPB changed its name to UPB-MyTeam to reflect its new ownership.
 No relegations for this seasons as the Liga Premier will be expanded to 13 teams for the 2007–08 season.

References

Malaysia Premier League seasons
2006 in Malaysian football
2007 in Malaysian football
Malaysia